Oscar L. Hauge (September 17, 1868—June 23, 1945) was an American politician.

He served in the Minnesota Legislature in 1911 and 1912 and then served on the Los Angeles County Board of Supervisors from 1938 until 1944.

Biography 
Hauge was born on a Minnesota farm on September 17, 1868. He was mayor of Long Beach, Calif., from 1927 to 1930. On December 1, 1938, he was appointed to the Los Angeles County Board of Supervisors to fill the vacancy created by the resignation of Leland M. Ford, who had just been elected to the United States Congress. He served until 1944.

Hauge's membership in the KKK was not known to the public while he was in office, but his KKK membership medal and ribbon remains in the Long Beach Library vault.

Early career 
At only age 21, Hauge served as township assessor in Faribault County. He then served in the Minnesota House of Representatives in 1911 and 1912 and was a Republican. Hauge later moved to Miles City, Montana where he served as chairman of the Republican Central Committee. In 1913 Hauge moved to Long Beach and participated in civic affairs. Hauge was also a member of the State Department of Finance for several years and from 1938 to 1944 he served as county supervisor for the Fourth District.

Education 
Hauge went to school in Chicago and graduated with a degree in dentistry.

Death 
On June 23, 1945, he died of a heart attack.

References 

1868 births
1945 deaths
Los Angeles County Board of Supervisors
Republican Party members of the Minnesota House of Representatives
People from Miles City, Montana
People from Faribault County, Minnesota
Montana Republicans
California Republicans